The men's long jump event at the 2000 Summer Olympics took place on Monday, 25 September, and Thursday, 28 September 2000, in Sydney, Australia. Fifty-three athletes from 38 nations competed. The maximum number of athletes per nation had been set at 3 since the 1930 Olympic Congress. The event was won by Iván Pedroso of Cuba, the nation's first medal and title in the men's long jump; it snapped a four-Games streak of American (and, specifically, Carl Lewis) victories. Jai Taurima took silver, Australia's third silver in the event (1948 and 1984). Roman Shchurenko earned Ukraine's first medal in the men's long jump with his bronze. It was the first time the United States had competed in the event and not won at least a silver medal; the Americans had previously failed to place in the top two only at the boycotted 1980 Games.

Background

This was the 24th appearance of the event, which is one of 12 athletics events to have been held at every Summer Olympics. The returning finalists from the 1996 Games were silver medalist James Beckford of Jamaica, sixth-place finisher Gregor Cankar of Slovenia, eighth-place finisher Mattias Sunneborn of Sweden, and twelfth-place finisher Iván Pedroso of Cuba. Pedroso had been the best long jumper in the world since 1995, winning the 1995, 1997, and 1999 world championships (he would later win again in 2001); he had struggled with a hamstring injury in 1996, hampering his Olympic medal hopes in Atlanta. The American team of Carl Lewis, Mike Powell, and Joe Greene which had competed together the last two Games, sweeping the 1992 medals and taking gold, bronze, and 5th in 1996, had completely turned over. The United States had no particularly strong replacements; the nation's top jumper, Dwight Phillips, would later be dominant in the event but was not there yet in 2000. Jai Taurima, of the host Australia, was Pedroso's strongest challenger.

Lithuania, Mauritius, Morocco, Namibia, and Uzbekistan each made their first appearance in the event. The United States appeared for the 23rd time, most of any nation, having missed only the boycotted 1980 Games.

Qualification

Each National Olympic Committee was permitted to enter up to three athletes that had jumped 8.05 metres or further during the qualification period. The maximum number of athletes per nation had been set at 3 since the 1930 Olympic Congress. If an NOC had no athletes that qualified under that standard, one athlete that had jumped 7.95 metres or further could be entered.

Competition format

The 2000 competition used the two-round format with divided final introduced in 1952. The qualifying round gave each competitor three jumps to achieve a distance of 8.15 metres; if fewer than 12 men did so, the top 12 (including all those tied) would advance. The final provided each jumper with three jumps; the top eight jumpers received an additional three jumps for a total of six, with the best to count (qualifying round jumps were not considered for the final).

Records

The standing world and Olympic records prior to the event were as follows.

No new world or Olympic records were set during the competition.

Schedule

All times are Australian Eastern Standard Time (UTC+10)

Results

Qualifying

The qualifying round was held on 25 September 2000. The qualifying distance was 8.15m. For all qualifiers who did not achieve the standard, the remaining spaces in the final were filled by the longest jumps until a total of 12 qualifiers.

Final

The final was held on 28 September 2000.

References

External links
Official results, qualification – IAAF.org
Official results, final – IAAF.org
Official Report of the 2000 Sydney Summer Olympics

Athletics at the 2000 Summer Olympics
Long jump at the Olympics
Men's events at the 2000 Summer Olympics